Manitoba Provincial Road 302 (PR 302) is a provincial road in Manitoba, Canada. The  road travels through parts of six municipalities.

Route description
The north terminus of PR 302 is located at the junction of PTH 44 and PR 215 near Beausejour. Along the way, it has short concurrences with PTH 15 and PR 210, and travels through the communities of Beausejour, Richer, La Broquerie, and Zhoda.

Along its route, the road surface of PR 302 alternates between pavement and gravel.  The following sections are paved, two-lane road: 
from PTH 44 (Beausejour) to PTH 15 (designated as Class A1 highway by Manitoba Infrastructure and Transportation)
from PR 501 to PTH 52 (La Broquerie)
from PTH 12 (Zhoda) to PR 201.

History
PR 302 was originally designated from Beausejour to PR 303. In 1985–1986, PR 302 extended further south to Vita along a new route from PR 303 to Zhoda and PR 208 from Zhoda to Vita.

References

External links
Official Manitoba Highway Map

302